Jørgen Christian Hansen (14 August 1890 – 10 September 1953) was a Danish rower who competed in the 1912 Summer Olympics.

He was a crew member of the Danish boat, which won the gold medal in the coxed four, inriggers.

References

External links
profile

1890 births
1953 deaths
Danish male rowers
Rowers at the 1912 Summer Olympics
Olympic rowers of Denmark
Olympic gold medalists for Denmark
Olympic medalists in rowing
Medalists at the 1912 Summer Olympics